Frances Clara Cleveland Preston (née Folsom, christened as Frank Clara; July 21, 1864 – October 29, 1947) was the first lady of the United States from 1886 to 1889, and again from 1893 to 1897, as the wife of President Grover Cleveland. She is the only first lady to have served the role during two non-consecutive terms.

Folsom met Grover Cleveland while she was an infant, as he was a friend of her father's. When her father died in 1875, Grover became her unofficial guardian. She was educated at Wells College, and after graduating, she married Grover while he was the incumbent president. When her husband lost reelection in 1888, they went into private life for four years and began having children. They returned to the White House when her husband was elected again in 1892, though much of her time in the second term was dedicated to her children.

The Clevelands had five children, four of whom survived to adulthood. Cleveland involved herself in education advocacy, serving on the Wells College board, supporting women's education, and organizing the construction of kindergartens. She was widowed in 1908, and she married Thomas J. Preston Jr. in 1913. She continued to work in education activism after leaving the White House, becoming involved with Princeton University. During World War I, she was active in the movement for  American involvement and advocated military preparedness. She died in 1947 and was buried alongside her first husband in Princeton Cemetery.

Early life

Childhood 

Frances Folsom was born in Buffalo, New York, on July 21, 1864, to Emma (née Harmon) and her husband, Oscar Folsom, a lawyer who was a descendant of the earliest European settlers of Exeter, New Hampshire. All of the Folsom family ancestors were English.  They settled in western New York after immigrating to the New England colonies that became Massachusetts, Rhode Island, and New Hampshire. She was the older of two children. Her sister, Nellie Augusta, died in infancy in 1872.

A long-time close friend of Folsom's father, Grover Cleveland met his future wife when she was an infant and he was twenty-seven years old. He was fond of her, buying her a baby carriage and doting on her as she grew up. Folsom began school at Madame Brecker's French Kindergarten and then Miss Bissell's School for Young Ladies.

Folsom's father died in a carriage accident on July 23, 1875. The court appointed Cleveland administrator of his estate, and he would become Folsom's unofficial guardian. The Folsoms moved to Medina, New York to live with Frances' maternal grandmother and briefly to Saint Paul, Minnesota to live with her Aunt Nellie. They later returned to Buffalo and continued to move to different boardinghouses until settling in a home. When she was 14, she joined the Presbyterian Church, to which she would remain devoted throughout her life. She was christened as a teenager under the name Frank, the name that she used prior to her marriage.

Young adulthood 
Folsom was highly educated for a woman in the 19th century. She attended Medina High School in Medina and Central High School in Buffalo. She left school before finishing, but Cleveland, then Mayor of Buffalo, obtained for her a certificate of completion and entry into Wells College in Aurora, New York as a sophomore where she quickly became the center of the school's social life. At Wells, she became interested in photography and political science, and she participated in the Phoenix Society debate club. She received three proposals of marriage while she was in college, two of which resulted in brief engagements. Cleveland maintained correspondence with her at this time, known to her as "Uncle Cleve". He would send her flowers while he was governor of New York and then while he was president. When permitting, he would also visit her at Wells, and she would accompany him on tours of the state.

Folsom was unable to attend Cleveland's inauguration as it conflicted with her final exams, but she was first able to visit him at the White House during spring break some weeks later. She was permitted to ascend the Washington Monument before its opening, where she met former White House hostess Harriet Lane, who would go on to become her mentor. She graduated on June 20, 1885. After graduating, she spent the summer at her grandfather's home in Wyoming County, New York. Cleveland proposed marriage to Folsom by letter while she was visiting a friend in Scranton, Pennsylvania. It's unclear when Cleveland's perception of his ward became romantic in nature, with scholars proposing ages as young as eleven.

When it was decided that Folsom would be the wife of the president, she met with Lane to learn the responsibilities of the role. After accepting, Folsom accompanied her mother and her cousin on a year-long tour of Europe, where she visited seven countries. Despite Folsom's eagerness to wed, Cleveland insisted that she take the opportunity to travel and contemplate her future before marriage. Everyone involved agreed to keep the planned wedding a secret, while the president's sister Rose Cleveland served as White House hostess in the meantime. Rumors of their engagement were initially dismissed as gossip, for speculation of the president's love life was common. Popular gossip considered Frances' mother to be a more likely partner.

By the time of the Folsoms' return voyage, reporters were tracking their whereabouts, and they were forced to board their ship home in secret. They were greeted by the press upon returning to the United States, and rumors of Cleveland's interest were seemingly confirmed when representatives of the president took them away. It was only the next night that the White House officially announced that the president intended to marry Frances Folsom. Cleveland visited Folsom in New York while he was in the city attending a Decoration Day parade. Shortly after they returned, the Folsom women took a train to Washington, D.C. in anticipation of the wedding.Media attention quickly turned Folsom into a celebrity.

First Lady of the United States

Wedding 

The wedding of Grover Cleveland and Frances Folsom took place on June 2, 1886, in the Blue Room of the White House. He was 49 and she was 21. The wedding was personally organized by the president and his sister, and the press was barred from attending. As the president wished for a quiet wedding, only 31 guests were present during the ceremony, though hundreds of spectators gathered outside of the White House to celebrate the wedding. Frances became first lady upon marrying the president. The Clevelands spent a week in Deer Park, Maryland on honeymoon, where they were closely followed by reporters. After the Clevelands returned from their honeymoon, two wedding receptions were held, one for the diplomatic corps, and one for the public.

Frances Cleveland was credited with the increased sociability of the president after their marriage, as he became more willing to engage in social events. The president set aside time in his busy schedule to be with his wife, attending the theater and going on carriage rides. Each evening, the couple drove to a private home the president had purchased for them to oversee improvements. Cleveland had little involvement in the political aspects of her husband's administration, but she was in charge of their home life. She insisted that he observe the Christian Sabbath by abstaining from work each Sunday.

First term 

Cleveland was much-loved as first lady, drawing an unprecedented level of media and public attention. She was the first first lady to have dedicated journalists writing about her activity. She maintained a strong public image, and was the regular subject of photographers. Her travels and activities were meticulously documented by reporters, to the president's ire. The furor at times even became dangerous, with large crowds pushing to see her, threatening to topple into her and one another. The publicity became significant enough that the Clevelands chose not to use the living quarters of the White House after their wedding. Instead, they moved to their private residence, the "Red Top", to escape from public attention.

While in the White House, Cleveland kept many canaries and mockingbirds. She became close friends with poet Richard Watson Gilder and his wife Helena de Kay Gilder, and she would accompany them in meeting prominent writers of the time. Cleveland received hundreds of letters each week, several times more than previous first ladies, prompting the use of form letters to more efficiently reply to them and the hiring (at her own expense) of her college friend Minnie Alexander as a secretary. She also scheduled many social events on Saturdays to ensure that they did not conflict with the schedules of working women that wished to meet her.She maintained a close relationship with the White House servants, giving them gifts on their birthdays and on Christmas.

In 1887, the Clevelands toured the United States. Frances endured a severe insect bite and a black eye, and she spent so much time shaking hands that she needed to use an ice pack at the end of every day. Their visit to Chicago was attended by 100,000 people, with the crowd becoming so large that Cleveland had to be taken away by aides while police and soldiers attempted to control the crowd. The crowds became a constant, often preventing their carriage from moving. Cleveland avoided such publicized appearances for the rest of her time as first lady.

Though Cleveland was not directly involved in politics, her popularity nonetheless served her husband's administration well. Many of the president's political opponents acknowledged the increased difficulty of attacking the administration when the first lady had such support, and critics were careful not to attack her lest they provoke backlash. She was once even sent as the president's representative during the Great Tariff Debate of 1888 to quietly observe from the visitor's gallery. Toward the end of the president's first term, opponents began crafting rumors to diminish her reputation. In 1888, a rumor developed that Grover was abusive toward Frances; in response, Frances praised her husband and harshly condemned the rumor as a political smear. Another rumor suggested that she was unfaithful to her husband, having an affair with newspaper editor Henry Watterson.

Private life 

When President Cleveland lost reelection in the 1888 presidential election, Frances' tenure as first lady ended, but she prophetically informed the staff that they would return the following term. After leaving the White House for the first time, the Clevelands sold the Red Top house and moved to Madison Avenue. Cleveland struggled with the transition from public to private life, having never run a private household of her own. She underwent a period of depression over the following months, and she retreated to the Gilders' cottage in Marion, New York. Frances and Grover for the most part led separate social lives after leaving the White House. She would find comfort in 1890 when they purchased the Gray Gables summer home in Buzzards Bay, Massachusetts, where the couple would develop their own private home life. Here they would often host for close friends, including the Gilders and actor Joseph Jefferson.

In between her tenures as first lady, Cleveland took on charity work and grew more involved in New York social life through her charitable projects. Much of this work was to support the construction of free kindergartens in New York. She also involved herself with fundraising work for Wells College. Cleveland became a mother with the birth of Ruth Cleveland (1891–1904), dedicating herself to the child and taking up work that was often performed by a nurse.

Grover ran for president again in the 1892 presidential election, and despite his misgivings, Frances' image was often used prominently in campaign material. Her social connections were valuable for the Cleveland campaign in New York; her charity work in the state and her friendship with the Gilders allowed the Clevelands to build connections with New York's The Four Hundred society and helped win over disaffected Republicans. These factors contributed to Grover winning in his home state, which he had failed to do in 1888. Nonetheless, he disapproved of any involvement she had in the political aspects of his career.

Second term 

After her husband's victory, Cleveland was the only first lady to ever hold the position nonconsecutively. She was more apprehensive of taking the role her second time, now being aware of all that it entailed. After returning to the White House in 1893, her routine largely resembled that of her first tenure as first lady. She would insist on evening drives with the president, and she had her birds and dogs returned to the White House. Her Saturday receptions returned as well. She also continued her work in the establishment of kindergartens, and became involved with the Home for Friendless Colored Girls, visiting the Metropolitan African Methodist Episcopal Church with the group in 1896.Cleveland received thousands of letters, and she had a typewriter brought to her desk so that she could manage her own communication with the public.

The Clevelands were upset at the extent of press and public attention focused on their daughter Ruth, and they controversially had the White House closed to the public while they were present. Again, they purchased a private residence outside of the White House. Harassment from the public did not end, however, and Cleveland was particularly frightened by an incident in 1894 when three men were stalking their home. Fearing for her children's safety, she had the local police station post a guard at their home, choosing not to worry her husband with the news.

Cleveland became increasingly protective of her husband during his second term—a reversal of their relationship in his first term. The president's work grew more difficult as the Panic of 1893 set in, and Cleveland found herself fretting over her husband. Furthermore, the president's health was in decline during his second term, and his wife became increasingly responsible for his well being, encouraging him to exert himself less. When it became apparent that the president had cancer, she took responsibility for keeping his condition a secret and tending to his health, despite her pregnancy, which, at this time, was in its seventh month. She provided excuses for his absences and wrote letters on his behalf, insisting that he was merely suffering from rheumatism.

Cleveland had two more children as first lady, Esther Cleveland (1893–1980) and Marion Cleveland (1895–1977), and much of her time was dedicated to raising her three children. She would even play on the floor with her children, to the shock of the servants who had never before seen a first lady act in such a manner. Cleveland also took an interest in German culture and the German language during her husband's second term, learning the language and even hiring a German nurse so her children would learn the language as well. She still made time for her hostess duties, receiving the familiar crowds that she had encountered during her previous time as first lady. She also received heads of state, including one instance in which she disregarded precedent by meeting with Infanta Eulalia of Spain at her hotel. She was not nearly as active, however, hosting only one in the 1894 social season.

Three thousand people attended the first lady's final Saturday reception to shake her hand. When Cleveland's time as first lady ended, she wept as she left the White House, personally saying goodbye to each member of the White House staff. This organized farewell would be replicated by future first ladies, becoming a tradition. Despite her emotional departure, she would later express relief that she was no longer first lady, remembering the rumors and falsehoods that surrounded her.

Widowhood and remarriage

After leaving the White House for the second time, the Clevelands bought a house in Princeton, New Jersey. They had two more children over the following years: Richard F. Cleveland (1897–1974) and Francis Cleveland (1903–1995). Their firstborn daughter, Ruth, died of diphtheria in 1904 at their Gray Gables vacation home. Wishing to avoid memories of their child's illness and death, they sold the home and purchased a summer home in Tamworth, New Hampshire. The Clevelands became involved in Princeton University and provided support for many Princeton students. Grover died in 1908, and Frances was left to raise their four remaining children alone. She refused the pension to which she was legally entitled as a widowed first lady. She did, however, accept the franking privilege that was offered to presidential widows in 1909.

After her husband's death, she became involved in a legal battle against writer Broughton Brandenburg, who had been paid by The New York Times for an article supposedly written by Cleveland before his death, but which was a fraud created by Brandenberg. In March 1909, she held a memorial program for her husband at Carnegie Hall. Her grief was somewhat abated by a vacation to Europe with her family from September 1909 to May 1910. Cleveland was invited to return to the White House for a dinner in her honor in 1913, much to the excitement of the staff that had known her previously.

On February 10, 1913, at the age of forty-eight, she married Thomas J. Preston Jr., a professor of archaeology at her alma mater, Wells College. Much like her engagement with Grover, she was secretive about the process to limit media attention. They were invited to the White House as guests of honor by President William Howard Taft to celebrate their engagement. She was the first presidential widow to remarry. After their marriage, they spent nearly a year living in London, and they would regularly travel Europe together thereafter. Her second husband would go on to teach at Princeton University, where she continued to be a prominent figure in campus social life.

Later life 
Frances was offered a position as president of the Daughters of the American Revolution, but she declined the role due to its political responsibilities. She campaigned against women's suffrage, and in May 1913, she was elected as vice president of the New Jersey Association Opposed to Woman's Suffrage, serving as president of the organization's Princeton chapter.

Cleveland was vacationing at St. Moritz, Switzerland, with her children when World War I began in August 1914. They returned to the United States via Genoa on October 1. Frances and her husband worked with activists Solomon Stanwood Menken and Robert McNutt McElroy as well as former presidents Theodore Roosevelt and William Henry Taft to promote military preparedness. She became a member of the pro-war National Security League, replacing her husband as its director of the Speaker's Bureau and the Committee on Patriotism through Education in November 1918. Though she had never given speeches as first lady, she did so regularly in this capacity. Frances and Thomas eventually disengaged from the organization. She caused controversy by accusing some Americans of being unassimilated, and she resigned from her position on December 8, 1919 in response to backlash against her proposal of a pro-war education curriculum.

In 1919, Cleveland worked with McElroy as he wrote the first biography of Grover Cleveland, and she contacted everyone that knew Grover, wishing to collect letters he wrote for archival in the Library of Congress. In 1922, she served as the head of Wells College's endowment fund. During the Great Depression of the 1930s, she became president of the Needlework Guild of America and lead its clothing drive for the poor.

Cleveland remained prominent in political circles during the 20th century. In the 1928 presidential election, she gave her only political endorsement to someone other than her first husband, endorsing Al Smith for president. She had met the Smiths and grew upset with the anti-Catholic attacks against him. Privately, she supported Franklin D. Roosevelt as president, she admired Eleanor Roosevelt, and she subsequently supported Harry S. Truman. During the Truman administration, she was invited to a luncheon at the White House where she met General Dwight D. Eisenhower. Eisenhower is quoted as not recognizing her and asking where in the city she used to live, prompting her to respond that she had lived in the White House.

Later in life, she was afflicted by cataracts, and she learned Braille to use a Braille typewriter. She would continue to use it after her cataracts were removed, translating books into Braille for blind children. She was involved with the theater community in her old age, sometimes traveling with the theater troupe founded by her son. Her final public appearance was at the Princeton University bicentennial celebration in June 1946. While staying at her son Richard's home for his 50th birthday in Baltimore, Cleveland died in her sleep at the age of 83 on October 29, 1947. She was buried in Princeton Cemetery next to President Cleveland, her first husband.

Legacy 

Cleveland was a very popular first lady, and her reputation helped define the role for generations after her tenure. Social events that she hosted were some of the most successful in White House history. Her presence in the White House mitigated her husband's gruff reputation and fostered an image of the president as a loving husband, and later as a loving father. In 1887, she was elected to the board of directors of Wells College, a position she would hold for over 50 years. In honor of Frances Cleveland, Cleveland Hall was constructed in 1911 on the Wells College campus. Originally a library, the building currently holds classes in foreign language and women's studies, as well as offering a food bank for those in need. Contemporaries ranked her among the greatest of first ladies. An 1982 poll placed her 13th out of 42, though the 2008 edition of the poll placed her 20th of 38.

Fashion and image 
Frances' fashion choices influenced women throughout the United States. This included her hairstyle, a low knot over a shaved nape, which became known as the á la Cleveland and was commonly imitated. Her beauty was widely celebrated in the press. The Women's Christian Temperance Union wrote to her requesting that she dress more modestly, fearing that she was setting a poor example. She refused to do so. Her fashion choices and purchases influenced the behavior of consumers, and products she used enjoyed an increase in popularity. An article published by the Atlanta Constitution falsely stated that she no longer purchased bustles, causing a decline in their popularity.

Cleveland's immense popularity led to the extensive use of her image in advertising, and many products falsely claimed to have her endorsement. It became such a problem that a bill was introduced to Congress that would establish personality rights and criminalize the unauthorized use of a person's image, but the bill did not pass. Cleveland updated her fashion choices during her husband's second term. Reflecting the trends of the Gay Nineties, she wore tight gowns, feather boas, and picture hats. News articles on her activities would continue to reference her beauty and her sense of fashion through her seventies.

Politics 
Cleveland did not publicly support political causes while serving as first lady, and the Clevelands condemned the Frances Cleveland Influence Clubs that formed in her name in 1892. Instead, she worked with charity groups, including the Needlework Guild, which made clothes for the poor, and the Christmas Club and the Colored Christmas Club, which gave gifts to children during the holiday season.She did not comment on the controversial issue of women's suffrage during her tenure as first lady, but she considered women's education to be an important step in equality and was an active supporter of women's schools. Cleveland had a strong interest in the arts, and she was a supporter of international copyright protections, attending a convention on the subject while first lady in 1888. She also provided charitable support, sponsoring many aspiring musicians. An exception to Frances Cleveland's avoidance of political activity was her interest in the political situation of the Republic of Hawaii. Frances endorsed Princess Ka'iulani's claim to the throne as the heir apparent.

Cleveland supported the temperance movement, personally abstaining from alcohol and donating to the Woman's Christian Temperance Union. Unwilling to impose these beliefs on others, however, she continued to serve wine at White House receptions. Frances endorsed some women's causes throughout her life, but she was opposed to women's suffrage. Like many female anti-suffragists of her generation, she felt that involvement in politics was an unfortunate duty to be avoided and that it risked women's control of the domestic sphere. She would, however, vote in elections after the ratification of the Nineteenth Amendment.

See also 

 Philippa Foot – English philosopher and Cleveland's granddaughter

References

External links

 Frances Cleveland at C-SPAN's First Ladies: Influence & Image

|-

1864 births
1947 deaths
19th-century American women
20th-century American women
Activists from Buffalo, New York
American people of English descent
Burials at Princeton Cemetery
Cornell family
First ladies of the United States
Grover Cleveland family
Wells College alumni